Clarion Township may refer to the following townships in the United States:

 Clarion Township, Bureau County, Illinois
 Clarion Township, Clarion County, Pennsylvania

Township name disambiguation pages